Lenwood is a census-designated place (CDP) in the Mojave Desert near Barstow, in San Bernardino County, California.

The population was 3,543 at the 2010 census, up from 3,222 at the 2000 census.

Geography
Lenwood is located at  (34.878, -117.108).

Demographics

2010
At the 2010 census Lenwood had a population of 3,543. The racial makeup of Lenwood was 2,133 (60.2%) White (41.6% Non-Hispanic White), 219 (6.2%) African American, 94 (2.7%) Native American, 37 (1.0%) Asian, 25 (0.7%) Pacific Islander, 813 (22.9%) from other races, and 222 (6.3%) from two or more races. Hispanic or Latino of any race were 1,675 persons (47.3%).

The whole population lived in households, no one lived in non-institutionalized group quarters and no one was institutionalized.

There were 1,133 households, 524 (46.2%) had children under the age of 18 living in them, 543 (47.9%) were opposite-sex married couples living together, 214 (18.9%) had a female householder with no husband present, 101 (8.9%) had a male householder with no wife present.  There were 122 (10.8%) unmarried opposite-sex partnerships, and 11 (1.0%) same-sex married couples or partnerships. 206 households (18.2%) were one person and 66 (5.8%) had someone living alone who was 65 or older. The average household size was 3.13.  There were 858 families (75.7% of households); the average family size was 3.50.

The age distribution was 1,158 people (32.7%) under the age of 18, 356 people (10.0%) aged 18 to 24, 919 people (25.9%) aged 25 to 44, 801 people (22.6%) aged 45 to 64, and 309 people (8.7%) who were 65 or older.  The median age was 29.4 years. For every 100 females, there were 99.9 males.  For every 100 females age 18 and over, there were 98.9 males.

There were 1,282 housing units at an average density of 579.2 per square mile, of the occupied units 636 (56.1%) were owner-occupied and 497 (43.9%) were rented. The homeowner vacancy rate was 3.5%; the rental vacancy rate was 8.3%.  1,822 people (51.4% of the population) lived in owner-occupied housing units and 1,721 people (48.6%) lived in rental housing units.

According to the 2010 United States Census, Lenwood had a median household income of $44,375, with 25.5% of the population living below the federal poverty line.

2000
At the 2000 census there were 3,222 people, 1,086 households, and 813 families in the CDP. The population density was 1,306.5 inhabitants per square mile (503.7/km). The racial makeup of the CDP was 66.8% White, 5.4% African American, 2.2% Native American, 0.8% Asian, 0.7% Pacific Islander, 18.1% from other races, and 5.9% from two or more races. Hispanic or Latino of any race were 37.3%.

Of the 1,086 households 39.1% had children under the age of 18 living with them, 53.6% were married couples living together, 14.8% had a female householder with no husband present, and 25.1% were non-families. 20.3% of households were one person and 5.9% were one person aged 65 or older.  The average household size was 2.97 and the average family size was 3.42.

The age distribution was 33.6% under the age of 18, 9.0% from 18 to 24, 28.7% from 25 to 44, 19.7% from 45 to 64, and 9.0% 65 or older.  The median age was 31 years. For every 100 females, there were 100.4 males.  For every 100 females age 18 and over, there were 100.3 males.

The median household income was $37,845 and the median family income  was $39,697. Males had a median income of $35,054 versus $23,919 for females. The per capita income for the CDP was $14,071.  About 12.0% of families and 16.2% of the population were below the poverty line, including 21.7% of those under age 18 and none of those age 65 or over.

Government

Media
In 2015, Lenwood was one of the filming locations for the film Sky as well as Barstow, Bombay Beach, Hinkley, Joshua Tree, Landers, Ludlow, Newberry Springs, and Victorville, California.

References

Census-designated places in San Bernardino County, California
Populated places in the Mojave Desert
Barstow, California
Mojave River
Census-designated places in California